V is the fifth studio album by American thrash metal band Havok, released on May 1, 2020. This is the band's only release with bassist Brandon Bruce, who would leave Havok in August of the following year. Two music videos were produced for the tracks "Phantom Force" and "Post-Truth Era."

Reception
The album has received both praises from critics and mixed to positive reviews from fans. With many critics calling it a modern metal masterpiece. LouderSound gave a high review and stated that the band has nailed 21st-century thrash with its new album V. "Denver thrashers Havok’s new album V is where old school thrash speed meets new school thrash attitude," they commented. "Although retro-minded, Havok sound sharp and as furiously relevant as ever even as we struggle onward through difficult times."  A reviewer of Distorted Sound Magazine praised it as being a modern-day classic that showcases the band’s talent for keeping alive the thrash sound. In Treblezine's review of the album, they also gave it high praise; Namely a switch of targets lyrically away and removing the toxic venom toward efforts of social justice and moving more towards the broader structures that poison and destroy the world. They further added with high regard to the vocals having a uniform of nasally thrashy half-bark, but bearing a surprising elasticity. "Their riffs have the perfect blend of finger-twisting menace and neck-snapping power," they added further "The bass is bright and round here, with plenty of treble and mid-range, cutting through the guitars like butter, having a sound sitting between the iconic spring of a fretless and the earthy growl of a fretted."

Track listing

Personnel 
Havok
 David Sanchez – vocals, rhythm guitar, rain stick on "Dab Tsog"
 Reece Scruggs – lead guitar
 Pete Webber – drums
 Brandon Bruce – bass, goat nails on "Dab Tsog"

Additional personnel
 Mark Lewis – engineering, mixing, mastering
 Eliran Kantor – artwork

Charts

References

External links
Official music videos
 
 

Havok (band) albums
2020 albums